Hereford College of Arts is an art school based in the West Midlands, UK, and is the only specialist college in the region dedicated to the Arts.

Description
It offers courses in both further and higher education fields, in Art & Design, Music and Performing Arts, to local, national and international students. The College has two campuses; Folly Lane is home to College-level courses and the former Royal National College for the Blind building on College Road is home to University-level courses. The BA (Hons) Artist Blacksmithing Course is the only one of its kind in the UK, and is taught at the largest teaching forge in Europe. Students at HCA exhibit their work regularly, and the College welcomes thousands of visitors every year to its annual Summer Show. Many students are selling their work before they graduate, via commissions, live briefs and their own practises. Music and Performing Arts students stage regular productions based at the College and at external venues. Students attend regular specialist shows and conferences and have good links with external companies to further activities.

Courses 

College Level Courses 
Diploma in Art & Design,
Extended Diploma in Art & Design,
Extended Diploma in Music,
Extended Diploma in Performing Arts, and the post-18 Foundation Diploma in Art & Design

The College offers a variety of University Level Courses, which are validated by The University of Wales Trinity Saint David

BA (Hons) Artist Blacksmithing,
BA (Hons) Contemporary Design Crafts,
BA (Hons) Fine Art, 
BA (Hons) Graphic & Media Design,
BA (Hons) Illustration,
BA (Hons) Illustration & Animation
BA (Hons) Jewellery Design,
BA (Hons) Music,
BA (Hons) Photography,
BA (Hons) Textile Design,
FdA Commercial Photography,
FdA Film & Photography

The College also offers Postgraduate courses in Fine Art and Contemporary Crafts and Short Courses for evening study and businesses, and Saturday Clubs for schoolchildren.

History 
 
The college was founded in 1851 and was known as the School of Art before becoming the Herefordshire College of Art & Design. The name changed to incorporate the inclusion of Music and Performing Arts. In 2012, a new Arts Space and main entrance for Folly Lane was unveiled, providing much needed social, café and exhibition space. Designed by Hewitt Studios and constructed by Keir Moss, the contemporary and innovative space was funded entirely from college reserves. Landscaped gardens and outdoor areas are integrated into the design. This highly functional space has already hosted a number of exhibitions and events as well as being enjoyed on a day-to-day basis by students and staff. It's kitted out with striking café furniture, soft seating and tables, flexible exhibition panels, wi-fi access and touch-screen computers.

The design and architecture has generated great interest from national and regional bodies, and has been shortlisted and awarded for:
 2014 Green Apple Award
 2013 Civic Trust Award
 2012 West Midlands RIBA Award
 2012 West of England LABC Building Excellence Award
 2012 Wood Award.
It has also been profiled by MADE to showcase how design is improving the quality of the built environment in the West Midlands and also featured in a cross-section of architectural journals and magazines from the UK and abroad.

In June 2013 HCA acquired the former Royal National College building on College Road.  This outstanding building provides much needed teaching, social, studio and workshop spaces for the growing University-Level community, and places degree students closer to the main campus on Folly Lane, with plenty of affordable student housing close-by, including halls of residence.

During summer 2013 HCA refurbished and adapted the spaces into studios, workshops, on-site library, photographic studios and stores, dark rooms and IT facilities including a large digital Mac and printing suite.

Notable students 
 Olly Alexander- Actor and lead singer of synth-pop trio Years & Years
 Rose Ellen Dix - Youtuber
 Sara Radstone -  ceramic artist
 Simon Carroll - Studio potter

See also

Hereford College of Education

References

External links
 http://www.hca.ac.uk College website

Education in Hereford
Art schools in England
Further education colleges in Herefordshire
University of Gloucestershire
University of Wales
Educational institutions established in 1851
1851 establishments in England
Arts organizations established in the 1850s
Recipients of Civic Trust Awards